Saltpeter (or saltpetre) is the mineral form of potassium nitrate (KNO3), a compound

It may also sometimes refer to:

  Sodium nitrate (NaNO3), a compound
 Chile saltpeter or nitratine, the mineral form 
 Norwegian saltpeter or calcium nitrate (Ca(NO3)2)
 Magnesium nitrate (Mg(NO3)2)

See also
 Saltpetre Republic, a term used in Chilean historiography for the 1879–1914 period
 Salpeter (disambiguation)